John Michael Josephs (16 January 1924 – 25 December 2012) was an English cricketer.  Josephs was a right-handed batsman who bowled slow left-arm orthodox.  He was born at Hendon, Middlesex, and was educated at Clifton College.

Josephs made his first-class debut for Leicestershire against Oxford University in 1946.  He made eight further first-class appearances for the county, the last of which came against Northamptonshire in the 1953 County Championship.  In his nine first-class appearances, Josephs scored 116 runs at an average of 9.66, with a high score of 25 not out.  With the ball, he took just a single wicket at an overall cost of 86 runs. Josephs died peacefully at home on Christmas Day 2012.

References

External links
John Josephs at Leicestershire County Cricket Club
John Josephs at ESPNcricinfo
John Josephs at CricketArchive

1924 births
People from Hendon
People educated at Clifton College
English cricketers
Leicestershire cricketers
2012 deaths